Agua Caliente Airport  (Agua Caliente Airstrip) is a public airport a mile northeast of Agua Caliente County Park, San Diego County, California. Agua Caliente translates to "Hot Water" from Spanish.

There is an average of one operation per day here, typically a general aviation transient. As of May 2014 no aircraft are based here. L54 has no food, fuel or services and limited aircraft parking but no tiedown fees. It usually is a destination for those flying in to visit the geothermally heated Agua Caliente Hot Springs or hike and camp in the Anza-Borrego Desert State Park.

For the 12-month period ending December 31, 2020, the airport had 4400 general aviation aircraft operations, an average of 367 per month.

References

External links 
 County of San Diego: Agua Caliente Airstrip

 Flying into Agua Caliente Springs Airport

Airports in San Diego County, California